is a Japanese football player.

Club statistics
Updated to 23 February 2017.

References

External links

Profile at FC Ryukyu
Profile at FC Maruyasu Okazaki

1991 births
Living people
Fukuoka University alumni
Association football people from Yamaguchi Prefecture
Japanese footballers
J3 League players
Japan Football League players
FC Ryukyu players
FC Maruyasu Okazaki players
Association football midfielders